"Cairo" is a song by Colombian singer-songwriter Karol G and singer-songwriter and producer Ovy on the Drums. It was written by Giraldo, Ovy on the Drums and Kevyn Cruz and produced by Drums, and was filmed in Egypt. The song was released on November 13, 2022 through Universal Music Latino, as the third single from her fourth studio album, Mañana Será Bonito.

Background 
The song was announced on November 8, 2022 through Karol G's social media platforms with the title, release date and a clip of the music video. The song was released on November 13, 2022.

Commercial performance 
"Cairo" debuted at number 8 on the US Bubbling Under Hot 100 during the chart dated December 3, 2022, failing to enter the US Billboard Hot 100. During it's 8th week on the chart, the song reached a new peak at number 7 on the chart dated February 4, 2023. During the release of its parent album, Mañana Será Bonito, the song entered the US Billboard Hot 100 chart at number 82. It became Ovy on the Drums' first entry on the chart.

On the US Billboard Hot Latin Songs chart dated November 26, 2022 the song debuted at number 16, becoming Ovy on the Drums highest debut and peaking song on the chart. The following week the song reached a new peak at number 11 on the chart dated December 3, 2022. It became Giraldo's twentieth top 15 and Drums' first on the chart.

On the Billboard Global 200 the song debuted at number 89 on the chart dated December 3, 2022, becoming Drums' first entry on the chart. On the chart dated March 11, 2023, the song reached a new peak of 51.

Music video 
The music video for "Cairo" was directed by Pedro Artola and was released on Karol G's YouTube channel on November 13, 2022.

Charts

Certifications

References 

2022 singles
2022 songs
Karol G songs
Spanish-language songs
Songs written by Karol G
Song recordings produced by Ovy on the Drums